Ran Abukarat (born 14 December 1988) is an Israeli retired international football player. He is the son of Maccabi Haifa veteran Avraham Abukarat.

Honours

Club
Maccabi Haifa
Israel State Cup (1): 2015–16

References 
 

1988 births
Living people
Israeli footballers
Hapoel Haifa F.C. players
Maccabi Haifa F.C. players
Israel under-21 international footballers
Liga Leumit players
Israeli Premier League players
Footballers from Haifa
Association football midfielders